Robert "Bob" Grubba was the director of engineering for Lionel Trains in the late 1990s.

He started Broadway Limited Imports in 2001 with partners Tony Wenzel of Oriental Limited and Bob Zimet of QS Industries, maker of QSI sound systems.  Broadway Limited Imports was the first company to offer sound and remote control equipped HO trains, and won the Model Railroader Magazine 2002 and 2003 Product of the Year and HO Model of the Year awards.  Mr. Zimet and Mr. Wenzel sold their shares to Mr. Grubba in 2004 and the company was moved to Ormond Beach, Florida.

In 2004, Grubba founded Precision Craft Models, Inc. which was the first company to install sound systems and remote control in the smaller N scale model trains.

Robert Grubba holds the following US patents:

External links
Broadway Limited Imports, LLC
"New York Times Technology Article" Steam Meets Silicon In New Toy Trains
"Amid recession woes, model train company expanding" at newsjournalonline.com
"Interview with Ken Silvestri and Bob Grubba" in Model Railroad News Magazine
"Classic Toy Trains" Lionel FasTrack article

Rail transport modellers
Living people
Year of birth missing (living people)